Argyarctia fuscobasalis is a moth of the family Erebidae. It was described by Shōnen Matsumura in 1930. It is found in Taiwan.

References

 , 2010: Tiger-moths of Eurasia (Lepidoptera, Arctiidae) (Nyctemerini by ). Neue Entomologische Nachrichten 65: 1-106, Marktleuthen.
 , 2007: Review of the genus Argyarctia Kôda (Lepidoptera, Arctiidae). Euroasian Entomological Journal 6 (1): 81-84.
 , 1984: Two new species of Arctiidae from Taiwan (Lepidoptera: Arctiidae). Tinea 11 (23): 199-201.
 , 1930: New species and forms of Arctiidae from Japan. Insecta Matsumurana 5 (1-2): 31-40, pl. 1, Sapporo.

Moths described in 1930
Moths of Taiwan
Endemic fauna of Taiwan
Spilosomina